Herrington Hill is a hill on the east side of Lavoisier Island, in the Biscoe Islands of Antarctica, about  southward of Benedict Point. It was mapped from air photos taken by the Falkland Islands and Dependencies Aerial Survey Expedition (1956–57), and was named by the UK Antarctic Place-Names Committee for Lovic P. Herrington, an American physiologist who has specialized in the reactions of the human body to cold environments.

References

Hills of Graham Land
Landforms of the Biscoe Islands